Dr. William Henderson House, also known as the Fox House, is a historic home located at Hummelstown, Pennsylvania.  It was built in 1854, and is a three-story, brick style townhouse on a stone foundation.  It has brownstone window sills and stoop. There is a three-story rear extension and, on that, a one-story frame addition dated to 1918.

It was added to the National Register of Historic Places in 1979.

References

Houses on the National Register of Historic Places in Pennsylvania
Federal architecture in Pennsylvania
Houses completed in 1829
Houses in Dauphin County, Pennsylvania
National Register of Historic Places in Dauphin County, Pennsylvania